Latchford may refer to:

Places

Australia 
Latchford Barracks, Australian Army base

Canada 
Latchford, Ontario, town

United Kingdom 
Latchford, Cheshire, a suburb of Warrington, England
Latchford railway station
Runcorn to Latchford Canal
Latchford, Hertfordshire, in Standon parish
Latchford, Oxfordshire, in Great Haseley parish

People 
Bob Latchford (born 1951), British international footballer
Dave Latchford (born 1949), British footballer
Douglas Latchford (1931–2020), British adventurer, art dealer, author and alleged smuggler
Ernest William Latchford (1889–1962), Australian army colonel
Francis Robert Latchford (1856–1938), Canadian politician
Jack Latchford (1909–1980), British cricketer
Peter Latchford (born 1952), English footballer
Stephen Latchford (1883–1974), American diplomat and lawyer